April Amber Telek (born April 29, 1975) is a Canadian actress.

Early life and career
Telek was born and raised on the North Shore of Vancouver, British Columbia. In Japan, she pursued her modeling career and won a Shiseido Cosmetics contract for Asia from 1989 to 1990. In April 1994, she won the title of Miss Canada and represented Canada in several international pageants. She is known for portraying Denise in George Lopez's Mr. Troop Mom.

Telek won the coveted Women In Film and Television Award of Artistic Merit at the Vancouver International Film Festival 2010 for her portrayal of Jana (loosely based on Lana Clarkson) in Amazon Falls. In June 2011, she also won the Leo Award, Best Performance by a Female in a Leading Role for a Feature Film, for Amazon Falls. In 2016, she was a voice performer in the video game Dead Rising 4 as a survivor. In 2017, she received another Leo Award nomination for Best Guest Performance by a Female
in a Dramatic Series for her role as Donna Williams in the TV series Rogue.

Personal life
April is married to Jamie Campbell and has one daughter from a previous relationship with Gaming Executive Joe LaCascia.

Rape accusation against Peter Nygard 
In 2020, Telek claimed she was raped by fashion mogul Peter Nygård. She made the claim soon after Nygård was accused of child sex trafficking. Telek told CBC's The Fifth Estate that in November 1993, she was contacted to model a new line of Nygard's clothing in Winnipeg. She stated that after arriving at Nygard's executive suite, he exposed himself, asked her for oral sex, and after she declined, he raped several times her over a two day period. Lawyers for Nygard said he denied any sexual assaults of anyone, and further said sworn statements from two witnesses disputed Talek's allegations.

Filmography

Film

Television

References

External links

1975 births
Actresses from Vancouver
Canadian film actresses
Living people
Canadian television actresses
20th-century Canadian actresses
21st-century Canadian actresses